The 2019 Kelly Cup playoffs of the ECHL began in April 2019 following the conclusion of the 2018–19 ECHL regular season. The Kelly Cup was won by the expansion Newfoundland Growlers in six games over the Toledo Walleye.

Playoff format
At the end of the regular season the top four teams in each division qualifies for the 2019 Kelly Cup playoffs and be seeded one through four based on highest point total earned in the season. Then the first two rounds of the playoffs are held within the division with the first seed facing the fourth seed and the second seed facing the third. The division champions then play each other in a conference championship. The Kelly Cup finals pits the Eastern Conference champion against the Western Conference champion.  All four rounds are a best-of-seven format.

Playoff seeds
After the regular season, 16 teams qualify for the playoffs. The Cincinnati Cyclones were the first team to qualify during the regular season on March 6, with the Florida Everblades qualifying shortly after on March 8. The Cyclones were the Western Conference regular season champions and the Brabham Cup winners with the best record in the ECHL. The Everblades earned the top seed in the Eastern Conference.

Final seeding:

Eastern Conference

North Division
Newfoundland Growlers – Division champions, 94 pts
Adirondack Thunder – 83 pts
Manchester Monarchs – 82 pts
Brampton Beast – 79 pts

South Division
Florida Everblades – Division champions, 106 pts
Orlando Solar Bears – 88 pts
South Carolina Stingrays – 76 pts
Jacksonville Icemen – 76 pts

Western Conference

Central Division
Cincinnati Cyclones – Brabham Cup winners, division champions, 110 pts
Toledo Walleye – 89 pts
Fort Wayne Komets – 82 pts
Kalamazoo Wings – 77 pts

Mountain Division
Tulsa Oilers – Division champions, 90 pts
Idaho Steelheads – 88 pts
Utah Grizzlies – 83 pts
Kansas City Mavericks – 78 pts

Playoff bracket

Division semifinals

North Division

(1) Newfoundland Growlers vs. (4) Brampton Beast

(2) Adirondack Thunder vs. (3) Manchester Monarchs

South Division

(1) Florida Everblades vs. (4) Jacksonville Icemen

(2) Orlando Solar Bears vs. (3) South Carolina Stingrays

Central Division

(1) Cincinnati Cyclones vs. (4) Kalamazaoo Wings

(2) Toledo Walleye vs. (3) Fort Wayne Komets

Mountain Division

(1) Tulsa Oilers vs. (4) Kansas City Mavericks

(2) Idaho Steelheads vs. (3) Utah Grizzlies

Division finals

North Division

(1) Newfoundland Growlers vs. (3) Manchester Monarchs

South Division

(1) Florida Everblades vs. (2) Orlando Solar Bears

Central Division

(1) Cincinnati Cyclones vs. (2) Toledo Walleye

Mountain Division

(1) Tulsa Oilers vs. (2) Idaho Steelheads

Conference finals

Eastern Conference

(S1) Florida Everblades vs. (N1) Newfoundland Growlers

Western Conference

(M1) Tulsa Oilers vs. (C2) Toledo Walleye

Kelly Cup finals

(N1) Newfoundland Growlers vs. (C2) Toledo Walleye

Statistical leaders

Skaters
These are the top ten skaters based on points. 

GP = Games played; G = Goals; A = Assists; Pts = Points; +/– = Plus/minus; PIM = Penalty minutes

Goaltending

This is a combined table of the top five goaltenders based on goals against average and the top five goaltenders based on save percentage, with at least 240 minutes played. The table is sorted by GAA, and the criteria for inclusion are bolded.

GP = Games played; W = Wins; L = Losses; OTL = Overtime Losses; SA = Shots against; GA = Goals against; GAA = Goals against average; SV% = Save percentage; SO = Shutouts; TOI = Time on ice (in minutes)

See also 
 2018–19 ECHL season
 List of ECHL seasons

References

External links
ECHL website

Kelly Cup playoffs
2018–19 ECHL season